Soslan is an Ossetian male given name widespread among Ossetians in Russia.

Origin
This given name originates from the Ossetian name for Sosruqo, a character in Caucasian mythology, in particular, in the Nart saga. It etymologically came from Turkic languages (Nogai suslan- "to look menacing", suslä "menacing, gloomy"). The variant Sosruqo is in turn an Adyghe borrowing from Sosru- (<Soslan) and qo (qwā) "son". 

In Ossetia, the name has been in use since at least the 12th century. The first documented person with this name was David Soslan, the second husband of the Georgian Queen Tamar.

Forms
The Russian patronymic forms are Soslanovich for men and Soslanovna for women.

Notable people
 Soslan Andiyev, Soviet wrestler
 Soslan Beriyev, Russian footballer
 Soslan Dzhanayev, Russian footballer
 Soslan Dzhioyev (footballer born 1989), Russian footballer
 Soslan Dzhioyev (footballer born 1993), Russian footballer
 Soslan Gatagov, Russian footballer
 Soslan Gattsiev, Uzbek-Belarusian wrestler
 Soslan Kachmazov, Russian footballer
 Soslan Ktsoyev, Russian wrestler 
 Soslan Ramonov, Russian wrestler
 Soslan Takazov, Russian footballer
 Soslan Tigiev, Uzbekistani wrestler 
 Soslan Tsirikhov, Russian shot put athlete

References